Jessy Trémoulière (born 29 July 1992) is a French rugby union player. She represented  at the 2014 and 2017 Women's Rugby World Cup. She was a member of the squad that won their fourth Six Nations title in 2014. She was a member of the France women's national rugby sevens team to the 2016 Summer Olympics. She was named player of the year 2018 at the world rugby award.

Trémoulière was named as the Women’s 15s Player of the Decade by World Rugby via a worldwide public vote. In 2022, She was named in France's team for the delayed 2021 Rugby World Cup in New Zealand.

References

External links
 
 
 

1992 births
Living people
French female rugby union players
Olympic rugby sevens players of France
France international rugby sevens players
Rugby sevens players at the 2016 Summer Olympics
Female rugby sevens players
France international women's rugby sevens players